The 2024 United States Senate election in Ohio will be held on November 5, 2024, to elect a member of the United States Senate to represent the state of Ohio. Incumbent three-term Democratic Senator Sherrod Brown is running for reelection to a fourth term in office. Brown is one of three Democratic senators up for re-election in states that Donald Trump won in both 2016 and 2020, alongside Senators Joe Manchin of West Virginia and Jon Tester of Montana. Brown's re-election is considered essential for Democrats' chances to retain the Senate majority in 2024.

The race is expected to be highly competitive, as Brown is generally popular amongst Ohioans, but the state has trended towards Republicans in recent years. Ohio voted for former President Donald Trump in both the 2016 and 2020 presidential elections and elected Republican J.D. Vance over Democrat Tim Ryan to fill the open seat vacated by retiring Republican Rob Portman in the 2022 election.

Democratic primary

Candidates

Declared
Sherrod Brown, incumbent U.S. Senator (2007–present)

Endorsements

Republican primary

Candidates

Declared
 Matt Dolan, state senator from the 24th district (2017–present) and candidate for U.S. Senate in 2022

Publicly expressed interest
Mark Kvamme, venture capitalist and sports car racing driver
Frank LaRose, Ohio Secretary of State (2019–present)
Bernie Moreno, former car dealership owner, father-in-law of U.S. Representative Max Miller, and candidate for U.S. Senate in 2022

Potential

Mike Gibbons, investment banker and candidate for U.S. Senate in 2018 and 2022
Dave Yost, Ohio Attorney General (2019–present) and former Ohio State Auditor (2011–2019)

Declined 
 Josh Mandel, former Ohio State Treasurer (2011–2019), nominee for U.S. Senate in 2012 and candidate in 2018 and 2022
 Vivek Ramaswamy, healthcare and technology executive (running for president)

General election

Predictions

References

External links
Official campaign websites
Sherrod Brown (D) for Senate
Matt Dolan (R) for Senate

United States Senate
Ohio
2024